Christine "Chris" Jurgenson ( Bodogh; born c. 1953) is a Canadian curler from British Columbia. She is a former World Champion, and was lead for the championship team at the World Senior Curling Championship in 2009 and skip for the 2011 World Senior Curling Championships . 
Jurgenson grew up in Ontario, where she played with her sister, Marilyn Bodogh. She won her first provincial title in 1980. She skipped Ontario to a 7–5 record at the 1980 Canadian Ladies Curling Association Championship.

In 1983, she played in Alberta, and made her second national championship, playing second for Cathy Shaw. At the 1983 Scott Tournament of Hearts, the team lost 5–4 to Nova Scotia, skipped by Penny LaRocque.

In 1986, she was back playing with her sister in Ontario, playing second for her. They would end up winning the 1986 Scott Tournament of Hearts, defeating the defending champion Linda Moore rink 7-4 in the final. They won the 1986 World Women's Curling Championship as Team Canada, defeating Germany's Andrea Schöpp 12–5 in the final.

The following season, the team represented Team Canada at the 1987 Scott Tournament of Hearts, finishing 4–7.

Jurgenson moved to British Columbia, and won her first B.C. provincial title there in 1995. At the 1995 Scott Tournament of Hearts, she played lead for Marla Geiger, and finished with a 6–5 record. She won her second B.C. provincial title, this time playing lead for Kelley Owen. The team finished with a 3–8 record, in last place. It would be her final trip to the Hearts.

Jurgenson won two provincial senior titles, in 2008 (playing lead for Pat Sanders) and again in 2010 as the skip. In both years, she won the Canadian Senior Curling Championships. Her 2008 and 2010 senior titles qualified her for the 2009 and 2011 World Senior Curling Championships. At the 2009 championship, the team won gold for Canada, defeating Switzerland's Renate Nedkoff 10-1. In 2011, Jugenson skipped her team to another gold medal, defeating Sweden's Ingrid Meldahl.

Personal life
At the time of the 1986 World Championships, she worked for her father's lumber company in St. Catharines, Ontario.

References

External links 

World Curling Federation profile
WCF profile duplicate entry, "Christine Bodogh-Jurgenson"

Canadian women curlers
Canadian people of Hungarian descent
Curlers from Ontario
Curlers from British Columbia
Curlers from Alberta
Living people
World curling champions
Canadian women's curling champions
1950s births